is a railway station on the Tobu Tojo Line in Toshima, Tokyo, Japan, operated by the private railway operator Tobu Railway.

Lines
Only "Local" (all-stations) trains stop at this station, with eight services per hour in each direction during the daytime.

Station layout

The station consists of a single island platform serving two tracks. The platforms are connected to the station entrance located on the west side of the tracks by an underground passage.

Platforms

History
This station was destroyed by fire on 14 April 1945 during Bombing of Tokyo in World War II, forcing its use to be suspended from 20 May, and then formally closed on 19 August 1947. The station reopened as Kita-Ikebukuro Station on 1 September 1951.

From 17 March 2012, station numbering was introduced on the Tobu Tojo Line, with Kita-Ikebukuro Station becoming "TJ-02".

Passenger statistics
In fiscal 2014, the station was used by an average of 8,921 passengers daily. The passenger figures for previous years are as shown below.

Accidents
On 22 July 2003 at 00:01, an unidentified passenger sitting between the rails was killed by a passing train.

On 21 July 2006 at around 09:30, a woman in her forties was hit and killed by a down train after attempting to cross the Tojo Line No. 2 level crossing immediately to the south of the station after the barriers had closed. Her 9-year-old daughter survived with serious injuries.

Surrounding area

 JR East Ikebukuro Depot
 Tokyo College of Transport Studies
 Showa Tetsudo High School
 Toshima Gakuin High school
 Toshima Ward Ikebukuro Library

See also
 List of railway stations in Japan

References

External links

 Kita-Ikebukuro Station information 

Tobu Tojo Main Line
Stations of Tobu Railway
Railway stations in Tokyo
Railway stations in Japan opened in 1934